The Andy Chambers Ranch is a historic district in Teton County, Wyoming, United States, that is listed on the National Register of Historic Places.

Description

The ranch is the only remaining nearly complete farmstead in Mormon Row, itself a historic district the southeast corner of Grand Teton National Park, in the valley called Jackson Hole. The locale was settled by Mormon migrants between 1900 and 1920, creating an enclave near the Gros Ventre River. The farmstead dates to the 1920s and includes a house, barn, garage and a variety of outbuildings.

The Mormon Row was a line village, similar to Grouse Creek, Utah, with a relatively dense development stretched along the line of the connecting road, allowing for extensive pasturage along either side behind the houses and buildings.

The Andy Chambers Ranch was added to the National Register of Historic Places on April 23, 1990.

See also

 National Register of Historic Places listings in Grand Teton National Park
 National Register of Historic Places listings in Teton County, Wyoming
 Historical buildings and structures of Grand Teton National Park

References

External links

 Mormon Row at Grand Teton National Park
 
 Andy Chambers Homestead at the Wyoming State Historic Preservation Office

Buildings and structures in Grand Teton National Park
Historic American Buildings Survey in Wyoming
Historic districts on the National Register of Historic Places in Wyoming
Mormon Row Historic District
Ranches on the National Register of Historic Places in Wyoming
National Register of Historic Places in Grand Teton National Park